Cabécou is a soft goat cheese that comes from the Midi-Pyrénées region of southern France.  It has a thin striped rind and after two weeks its crust grows blue mold changing its taste. It is one of Aquitaine's most famous foods. Aquitaine is a region in the lower bottom of France. The coloration of this creation is a calm cream color. Cabécou is a cheese generally made from raw goat's milk originating from the regions of the Massif Central such as Quercy, Rouergue, Haute-Auvergne, Limousin and Périgord.

Its best consumption period extends from April to August.

The name comes from the Occitan word cabra/craba which means goat.

See also
 List of goat milk cheeses

References

External links
 Cabecou on Fromage.com

French cheeses
Occitan cheeses
Goat's-milk cheeses